Muldashevo (Muldaş) is a rural locality (a village) in Ilchigulovsky Selsoviet, Uchalinsky District, Bashkortostan, Russia. The population was 81 as of 2010. There are 3 streets.

Geography 
Muldashevo is located 74 km northeast of Uchaly (the district's administrative centre) by road. Muldakayevo is the nearest rural locality.

References 

Rural localities in Uchalinsky District